USS Cossatot (AO-77) was a United States Navy World War II Type T2-SE-A1 tanker which served as a fleet oiler. Launched as SS Fort Necessity on 28 February 1943 by the Sun Shipbuilding & Dry Dock Co., Chester, Pennsylvania, under a Maritime Commission contract; sponsored by Mrs. W. Taylor; acquired by the Navy on 17 March 1943; and commissioned on 20 April 1943. It was named for a river in Arkansas.

World War II
Sailing from Norfolk to Baytown, Texas, to load kerosene, gasoline, and fuel oil in July 1943, Cossatot sailed from Norfolk on 6 August to fuel convoy escorts during their passage to Casablanca, returning to Norfolk on 14 September. She made seven such voyages from Norfolk to the North African ports of Casablanca, Oran, and Bizerte between 4 October 1943 and 30 November 1944.

Cossatot put to sea from Norfolk again on 28 December 1944 bound for the Pacific. She loaded diesel oil, fuel oil, and gasoline at Aruba, Netherlands West Indies, and arrived at Pearl Harbor on 30 January 1943. She operated from Saipan from 12 February fueling ships of the 6th Fleet until 3 March, when she began operations from Ulithi. Cossatot sortied as a part of TG 60.8, the logistics group for the 6th Fleet, for operations off Iwo Jima from 13 March to 12 April. On 16 April she sailed with her group to conduct fueling operations off newly assaulted Okinawa. On 28 April she downed a suicide plane as it dove toward her, and remained on this duty unscathed until 4 May when she arrived at Ulithi to reload. From 26 May until the end of the War, Cossatot operated out of Ulithi fueling various units of fast carrier TF 38, engaged in the final strikes against the Japanese homeland.

Cossatot left Ulithi on 3 September for Okinawa and Sasebo, arriving on 21 September to fuel ships of the occupation force. On 12 November she sailed from Yokosuka for San Francisco, arriving on 26 November.

Cossatot received two battle stars for World War II service.

Post-war
Cossatot was placed out of commission in reserve 7 March 1946 and transferred to the Maritime Commission on 28 October 1946. Reacquired in February 1948, she was transferred to the Military Sea Transportation Service on 1 October 1949 where she has served in a noncommissioned status under the Maritime Administration.

While underway in the Pacific Ocean on 16 April 1963 Cossatot reported seeing an unidentified flying object on a straight and fast course in the skies. No investigation was put forward.

On 15 June 1968 Cossatot was damaged after a collision with the merchant vessel Copper State, in fog, off the coast of Santa Cruz, California.  Cossatot was carrying  of jet fuel and lost  of her bow section in this collision. Cossatot was stricken on 18 September 1974 and sold 2 September 1975.

Beginning in September 1975, Cossatot was broken up by Luria Bros & Co Inc.

Notes

References

External links
 The T2 Tanker Page
Encyclopedia of Arkansas History & Culture entry

 

Suamico-class oilers
Type T2-SE-A1 tankers of the United States Navy
1943 ships
Ships built by the Sun Shipbuilding & Drydock Company
World War II tankers of the United States
Maritime incidents in 1968